Canada–Georgia relations refers to the current and historical relations between Canada and Georgia. Both nations are members of the United Nations.

The Georgian community in Canada is a total of 3,155 based on the Canadian Census 2011, having an increase compared to the 2006 Census. Most Georgian-Canadians reside in larger metropolitan areas across the country.

History
Canada recognized Georgia soon after its separation from the Soviet Union in 1991. In July 1992, Canada and Georgia formally established diplomatic relations. Since establishing diplomatic relations; relations between both nations have gradually been increasing.

In 2008 during the Russo-Georgian War, Canada strongly supported the territorial integrity and sovereignty of Georgia and its democratically elected government. Furthermore, Canada has not recognized the independence of Abkhazia and South Ossetia and continues to view them as integral parts of Georgia.

In 2011, Georgia opened a resident embassy in Ottawa. That same year, Canada opened an honorary consulate in Tbilisi. The Canadian government has committed to humanitarian assistance and a joint funding project with the United States, establishing and expanding the Explosive Remnants of War Coordination Center in Georgia. Georgia has received endorsement from Canada for eventual membership in NATO. 

In October 2011, both nations signed a memorandum of understanding to further promote economic relations.

Trade
In 2019, trade between Canada and Georgia totaled CAD$39 million. Canada's main exports to Georgia include: vehicles and equipment; machinery; animal based products; and chemical based products. Georgia's main exports to Canada include: food products; textiles; metals; and vehicles.

Resident diplomatic missions
 Canada is accredited to Georgia from its embassy in Ankara, Turkey and maintains an honorary consulate in Tbilisi.
 Georgia has an embassy in Ottawa.

See also
 Foreign relations of Canada
 Foreign relations of Georgia
 Georgians in Canada

References 

 

Georgia
Canada
Canada–Georgia (country) relations